The Brothers McGregor is a British situation comedy series set in Liverpool, and a spin-off of ITV soap opera Coronation Street, featuring two characters that originally appeared in the soap for one episode in May 1982. The show ran for four series between 1985 and 1988. It was produced by Granada TV, with the episodes written by Julian Roach and John Stevenson, who were also writing episodes of Coronation Street at the time. Unable to get Carl Chase and Tony Osoba back to play the roles, Philip Whitchurch and Paul Barber were cast instead.

Cast
 Philip Whitchurch as Cyril McGregor
 Paul Barber as Wesley McGregor
 Jean Heywood as Dolly McGregor
 Jackie Downey as Glenys Pike
 Allan Surtees as Colwyn Stanley
 Terry Cundall as Nigel

References

Other sources 
 https://www.youtube.com/watch?v=gpvkWyKeUm8 YouTube - The Brothers MacGregor

External links
 
 

1985 British television series debuts
1988 British television series endings
1980s British sitcoms
British television spin-offs
Coronation Street spin-offs
English-language television shows
ITV sitcoms
Television characters introduced in 1982
Television series about brothers
Television series by ITV Studios
Television shows produced by Granada Television
Television shows set in Liverpool